James Tervit Stevenson (10 November 1903 – 1973) was a Scottish professional footballer who played as an inside right.

Career
Born in Newmains, Stevenson spent his early career with Newmains, Overtown Rangers, Third Lanark and South Shields. He combined his early playing career with work as an engineer. He scored 24 goals in 54 league games for South Shields after signing for them in 1926.

He signed for Bradford City in July 1929, scoring 1 goal in 10 league appearances for the club, before moving to Aldershot in July 1931. He later played for Stockport County, Walsall and Macclesfield Town.

He had three spells at Stockport, also served as reserve team trainer after leaving Macclesfield, and in 2002 he was inducted into the Stockport County Hall of Fame.

He also served as player-manager of Macclesfield in the 1936–37 season, scoring twice in 9 league games for them. After leaving Macclesfield he returned to Stockport, serving a reserve team trainer.

Sources

References

1903 births
1973 deaths
Date of death missing
People from Newmains
Sportspeople from Wishaw
Scottish footballers
Third Lanark A.C. players
South Shields F.C. (1889) players
Bradford City A.F.C. players
Aldershot F.C. players
Stockport County F.C. players
Walsall F.C. players
Macclesfield Town F.C. players
Stockport County F.C. wartime guest players
English Football League players
Association football inside forwards
Macclesfield Town F.C. managers
Stockport County F.C. non-playing staff
Scottish football managers
Footballers from North Lanarkshire